Sundiata may refer to:

Sundiata Keita (c. 1217-1255), the king of the Mandinka people and founder of the Mali Empire, subject of the epic poem known as "Sundiata" or "Son Jara"
Epic of Sundiata, his story
Sundiata Acoli (born 1939), African-American prisoner
Sekou Sundiata (1948-2007), African-American poet and performer
Daniel Sunjata (born 1971), American actor
Sundiata Gaines (born 1986), American basketball player
Ibrahim K. Sundiata, American historian
Sundiata (album), a 1995 album by jazz saxophonist Chris Potter